Latreille is a French surname. Notable people with the surname include:

Francis Latreille, French American artist and photographer
Pierre André Latreille (1762–1833), French zoologist
Phil Latreille, ice hockey player

See also
Treille (disambiguation)

French-language surnames